Joe Sherlock (26 September 1930 – 10 September 2007) was an Irish Labour Party politician who served as a Teachta Dála (TD) from 2002 to 2007, 1987 to 1992 and 1981 to 1982. He was a Senator for the Labour Panel from 1993 to 1997.

Sherlock was born in Kildorrery, County Cork, in 1930. He was educated at the local national school. He took part in the IRA's Border Campaign as a young man, which resulted in him being imprisoned in Mountjoy Prison for six months. However, following the failure of the campaign, he endorsed the IRA's and Sinn Féin's move towards social activism and participating in politics. He worked at the local sugar factory for 18 years, and first held political office in 1967, when he was elected to Mallow Urban District Council as a Sinn Féin representative. During the split in Sinn Féin in 1970, Sherlock remained with the "Official" wing of the movement. In 1974, he was elected to Cork County Council. He served as Chairperson of Mallow UDC. He held both seats until the ending of the dual mandate in 2003. He was first elected to Dáil Éireann at the 1981 general election as a Sinn Féin - The Workers' Party TD.

Sherlock was re-elected at the February 1982 general election, but lost his seat at the November 1982 general election. Despite the loss of his seat, he continued to be active in local politics. He was elected to the Dáil again at the 1987 and 1989 general elections, but lost his seat at the 1992 general election. Joining the new Democratic Left party, he was elected to Seanad Éireann in 1993 (as part of an election pact with the Progressive Democrats), serving in the upper house until 1997. He failed to be elected to the Dáil again at the 1997 general election, but eventually regained his seat after ten years at the 2002 general election.

In July 2005, Sherlock announced that he would not be standing again in the next general election. His son Seán Sherlock, then a member of both Cork County Council and Mallow Town Council, was elected at the 2007 general election to succeed him.

He died on 10 September 2007, after a short illness.

References

External links
Statement by Labour Party leader Eamon Gilmore following Joe Sherlock's death – 13 September 2007

 

1930 births
2007 deaths
Democratic Left (Ireland) TDs
Democratic Left (Ireland) senators
Irish Republican Army (1922–1969) members
Labour Party (Ireland) TDs
Local councillors in County Cork
Members of the 20th Seanad
Members of the 22nd Dáil
Members of the 23rd Dáil
Members of the 25th Dáil
Members of the 26th Dáil
Members of the 29th Dáil
People from Mallow, County Cork
Politicians from County Cork
Workers' Party (Ireland) TDs